Qəribli (also, Garibli) is a village and municipality in the Agdash Rayon of Azerbaijan.  It has a population of 969.

References 

Populated places in Agdash District